Events from the year 1316 in Ireland.

Incumbent
Lord: Edward II

Events
10 August – Battle of Athenry; rebellious Irish chiefs of Connacht defeated and killed.
The Earl of Kildare founds the Augustinian Adare Friary in County Limerick.
Ualgarg Mór Ó Ruairc is made king of West Breifne by Fedlim Ó Conchobair, king of Connacht.

Births

Deaths

References

 
1310s in Ireland
Ireland
Years of the 14th century in Ireland